Risky Business is the twenty-first major release and fourth soundtrack album by Tangerine Dream. It is the soundtrack to the 1983 film Risky Business, starring Tom Cruise, and also includes songs by Bob Seger, Muddy Waters, Jeff Beck, Prince, Journey and Phil Collins. The Tangerine Dream selections consisted of two new compositions and three reworkings of previously released material (from 1979 and 1981), retitled to correspond to scenes in the movie. AllMusic noted that the soundtrack is a mix of electronic music from Tangerine Dream, plus rock, blues and funk songs from other music artists.

Although the film included "Every Breath You Take" by the Police, "Hungry Heart" by Bruce Springsteen, and "Swamp" by Talking Heads (which includes the lyric "risky business"), these were not released with the soundtrack.

Track listing

Personnel
 Edgar Froese – keyboards, electronic equipment, guitar
 Christopher Franke – synthesizers, electronic equipment, electronic percussion
 Johannes Schmoelling – keyboards, electronic equipment

Audio Movie Kit
Risky Business - The Audio Movie Kit was released to radio stations to promote the film. The kit was two LPs with trailers, interviews and eight music clips.

References

1984 soundtrack albums
Comedy film soundtracks
Tangerine Dream soundtracks
Virgin Records soundtracks